Antis may refer to:
 Antis (band), a Lithuanian postmodernist rock band
 Antis (dog), a dog that received the Dickin medal for bravery during World War II
 Antis Township, Blair County, Pennsylvania
 In antis, an architectural term for columns or pillars on the side of a door or window that are not detached from the main structure.
Antis, an Indonesian home and cleaner products company.

See also

Antes (name)
Antos (name)